Kite is a city in Johnson County, Georgia, United States, along the Little Ohoopee River. The population was 241 at the 2010 census. Kite is part of the Dublin Micropolitan Statistical Area.

History
The town was named after Shaderick Kight, who donated the land to build the town. He requested the simpler spelling of the name for more efficient mail delivery and processing.

The Georgia General Assembly incorporated Kite in 1891.

Geography

Kite is located in eastern Johnson County at  (32.691472, -82.515378). U.S. Route 221 passes through the center of town as Montgomery Street, leading north  to Bartow and south  to Soperton. Georgia State Route 57 (Kight Road) crosses US 221 in the center of Kite, leading west  to Wrightsville, the Johnson county seat, and southeast  to Swainsboro.

Climate

Demographics

As of the census of 2000, there were 241 people, 108 households, and 68 families residing in the town. The racial makeup of the town was 96.68% White, 2.90% African American, 0.41% from other races. Hispanic or Latino of any race were 2.49% of the population.

There were 108 households, out of which 17.6% had children under the age of 18 living with them, 46.3% were married couples living together, 13.0% had a female householder with no husband present, and 37.0% were non-families. 35.2% of all households were made up of individuals, and 20.4% had someone living alone who was 65 years of age or older.  The average household size was 2.23 and the average family size was 2.90.

In the town, the population was spread out, with 19.9% under the age of 18, 7.9% from 18 to 24, 22.0% from 25 to 44, 26.6% from 45 to 64, and 23.7% who were 65 years of age or older.  The median age was 45 years. For every 100 females, there were 99.2 males.  For every 100 females age 18 and over, there were 99.0 males.

The median income for a household in the town was $21,563, and the median income for a family was $28,750. Males had a median income of $23,438 versus $16,875 for females. The per capita income for the town was $16,261.  About 22.9% of families and 28.2% of the population were below the poverty line, including 55.6% of those under the age of eighteen and 11.4% of those 65 or over.

References

External links
Official Site

Cities in Johnson County, Georgia
Cities in Georgia (U.S. state)
Dublin, Georgia micropolitan area